Nupharin may refer to:
 Nupharine, a quinolizidine alkaloid found in Nuphar and Nymphaea species
 Nupharin A, B, C, D, E and F, ellagitannins found in Nymphaeaceae

References